MUW may refer to:

 Mississippi University for Women, Columbus, Mississippi
 Medical University of Vienna (German: Medizinische Universität Wien), Vienna, Austria
 Medical University of Warsaw, Warsaw, Poland
 Make-up Water